Slieve Gallion is a mountain in County Londonderry, Northern Ireland. It is the easternmost of the Sperrin Mountains.

The mountain is part of the parishes of Desertmartin, Lissan and Ballinascreen.

Nature
Slieve Gallion is a volcanic plug. The mountain is formed from volcanic-derived igneous rock, and also granite on the southern slopes. It is steep, and has a flat top. There is a telecommunications mast on the northeastern summit. To the west, the landscape consists of blanket bog and coniferous forest; most of the trees in the Slieve Gallion area are Sitka spruce. There are also lodgepole pine trees, as well as oak towards the south of the area. Animal species living in the area include the Irish hare (a sub-species of the mountain hare), the curlew, and the red grouse. The otter can also be found around nearby rivers. Slieve Gallion is classed by the Northern Ireland Planning Service as an area of "High Scenic Value".

History
Peat formed at Slieve Gallion in the early Holocene period, around 10,000 years ago. The radiocarbon dating of pollen has shown that there were plants in the area 10,000 years ago. 7,000 ago, the number of alder trees steeply increased.

From the Middle Ages until the 20th century, gatherings were held on the mountain to mark the festival of Lughnasadh. In recent decades, there has been an increase in the number of sheep grazing in the area, as well as an increase in mountain biking and hill walking, contributing to erosion.

Sport
There was formerly a challenge walk/run from the village of Moneymore to the summit of Slieve Gallon, which took participants through idyllic countryside such as Cairndaisy glen and the Postmans Way. There is now a yearly mountain race from the foot of Inniscarn Forest to the mountaintop and back, which normally takes place on the last Saturday of September or the first Saturday of October. Organised under the Northern Ireland Mountain Running Association, this event attracts some of Northern Ireland's top athletes and hosted the British & Ireland Junior Mountain Running Championships in October 2006.

The sports of hang gliding and paragliding use Slieve Gallion. This site is considered a good starting point to go cross-country as there is little in the way of airspace restrictions in a downwind direction from its predominate flyable faces.

Other
In 2019 a wind farm was constructed on its eastern side known as Crockandun wind farm.

Australian Gold firm Walkabout resources could collaborate with Koza UK to start a gold mine on the mountain. As of August 2020 the joint venture only holds a prospecting license and has not submitted plans for a gold mine. The project has been rejected by the district council of Mid Ulster.

See also
TSS Slieve Gallion, a twin-screw steam cargo vessel named after the mountain

References

Mountains and hills of County Londonderry
Marilyns of Northern Ireland
Volcanic plugs of Northern Ireland